Bolivia competed at the 1972 Summer Olympics in Munich, West Germany. Eleven competitors, all men, took part in nine events in three sports.

Athletics

Men's 100 metres
Lionel Caero
 First Heat — 11.19s (→ did not advance)

Men's Marathon
 Ricardo Condori
 Final — 2:56:11 (→ 58th place)
 Crispín Quispe
 Final — 3:07:22 (→ 61st place)
 Juvenal Rocha
 Final — did not finish (→ no ranking)

Equestrianism

Roberto Nielsen-Reyes

Shooting

Six male shooters represented Bolivia in 1972.

50 m pistol
 Jaime Sánchez

50 m rifle, prone
 Fernando Inchauste
 Eduardo Arroyo

Trap
 Armando Salvietti
 Ricardo Roberts

Skeet
 Carlos Asbun
 Armando Salvietti

References

External links
Official Olympic Reports

Nations at the 1972 Summer Olympics
1972 Summer Olympics
Olympics